Clifford Place Plantation or Clifford Place was a cotton plantation of unknown size, located in southern Leon County, Florida, United States, owned by George Taliaferro Ward.

Clifford Place would have been in the vicinity of Waverly Plantation and Southwood Plantation.

References

Plantations in Leon County, Florida
Cotton plantations in Florida